Bannaella is a genus of East Asian cribellate araneomorph spiders in the family Dictynidae, and was first described by Z. S. Zhang & S. Q. Li in 2011.  it contains only three species, all found in China: B. lhasana, B. sinuata, and B. tibialis.

References

Araneomorphae genera
Dictynidae
Spiders of China